Tot Qualters (March 28, 1894 – March 27, 1974) was an American actress, dancer, and singer in musical theatre.

Early life
Marguerite (or Margaret) Qualters was born in 1894, in Detroit, the daughter of Jack Qualters and Anna Qualters. She and her four sisters went into stage careers after their father died. Tot's sister Cassie Qualters joined the Ziegfeld Follies with her. Their brother Joe Qualters was a cabaret singer in Detroit.

Career
Tot Qualters was on stage in Detroit from her early teens.  Qualters' New York debut came in 1912, in Ziegfeld's A Winsome Widow at the Moulin Rouge Theater. Other stage appearances included Chin Chin (1914), Stop! Look! Listen! (1915-1916), Ziegfeld Follies of 1916, Miss 1917, Midnight Rounders (1920), The Passing Show of 1921, Make It Snappy (1922, with Eddie Cantor) and Whoopee! (1928, also with Eddie Cantor). "Tot Qualters sports a figure as cute as her name," observed The Dial'''s theatre reviewer in 1921. The Boston Daily Globe'' described her specialty as "loose-jointed eccentric dancing" in 1922.

She also appeared in the film Reaching for the Moon (1930), with Douglas Fairbanks Sr. and Bebe Daniels.

Personal life
Walter Winchell mentioned seeing Tot Qualters in 1968, as a fixture at Max's Stage Deli. Tot Qualters died in 1974, the day before her 80th birthday, in New York City.

References

External links
 Tot Qualters' listing at IBDB.

American actresses
American female dancers
1894 births
1974 deaths
20th-century American dancers
20th-century American women